The Edmonton Skyhawks were a professional basketball franchise based in Edmonton, Alberta that played in 1993 and 1994. The Skyhawks were members of the National Basketball League. The team moved to Edmonton from Hamilton, Ontario for the 1993 playoffs. It remained in Edmonton for the 1994 season, which saw the league fold before the schedule ended.

The Skyhawks played their games at Northlands Coliseum.

Sources
NBL Statistics

National Basketball League (Canada) teams
Sport in Edmonton
Defunct basketball teams in Canada
Basketball teams established in 1993
Sports clubs disestablished in 1994
Basketball teams in Alberta
1993 establishments in Alberta
1994 disestablishments in Alberta